Our House in Cameroon is a 1961 West German adventure film directed by Alfred Vohrer and starring Johanna von Koczian, Götz George and Hans Söhnker.

Cast
 Johanna von Koczian as Doris Kröger
 Götz George as Georg Ambrock
 Hans Söhnker as Willem Ambrock
 Horst Frank as Klaas Steensand
 Berta Drews as Tante Edith
 Walter Rilla as Konsul Steensand
 Kenneth Spencer as Bismarck
 Katrin Schaake as Christine Ambrock
 Helga Sommerfeld as Manuela Ingarides
 Hans Fitze as Pfarrer
 Uwe Friedrichsen as Rolf Ambrock
 Helga Münster as Ina Lorenz
 Henry Vahl as Taxifahrer
 Käte Jaenicke as Elli Dörfler

References

Bibliography 
 Bock, Hans-Michael & Bergfelder, Tim. The Concise CineGraph. Encyclopedia of German Cinema. Berghahn Books, 2009.

External links 
 

1961 films
1961 adventure films
German adventure films
West German films
1960s German-language films
Films directed by Alfred Vohrer
Gloria Film films
Films set in Cameroon
Films set in Hamburg
1960s German films